Ministry of Welfare may refer to:
 Ministry of Welfare (Iceland)
 Ministry of Welfare and Social Security, Iran

See also 
 Ministry of Social Affairs
 Ministry of Social Security
 Ministry of Social Welfare (disambiguation)